Frazer Will (born May 10, 1982 in Star City, Saskatchewan) is a Canadian judoka, who won gold medals at the 2006 and 2007 Pan American Judo Championships, the 2007 Chinese Open and four national championships in the lightweight (60 kg) division. He finished in 7th place in his division at the 2008 Summer Olympics in Beijing.

See also
Judo in Canada
List of Canadian judoka

References

External links

Video
2010 World Judo Championships -60 kg match Frazer Will vs. Albert Techov (Judo Portal)

1982 births
Living people
Canadian male judoka
Olympic judoka of Canada
Judoka at the 2008 Summer Olympics
Judoka at the 2011 Pan American Games
Sportspeople from Saskatchewan
People from Tisdale, Saskatchewan
Pan American Games competitors for Canada
20th-century Canadian people
21st-century Canadian people